Karen Mitzo Hilderbrand (born 1962) is an American songwriter and author publishing children's educational materials, based in Akron, Ohio.

Early life and education
Hilderbrand was born Karen Mitzo on July 16, 1962, along with her twin sister Kim. She attended Purdue University and graduated in 1985 with a degree in Industrial Engineering.

Career
Hilderbrand began writing songs in 1987 with her sister Kim Thompson, and after five years they began working full-time to create educational materials. They have since created more than 500 albums, written 3,000 songs and produced 160 e-books and 700 audiobooks. They have also produced 15 mobile apps. Hilderbrand is the CEO of Creative IP, LLC. and Twin Sisters Digital Media, headquartered in Stow, Ohio. In 2012, Scholastic announced a distribution agreement with Twin Sisters for musical and non-fiction e-books.

Discography
Hilderbrand and Thompson have total album sales of more than 50 million, including one RIAA certified platinum and eight certified gold albums. All albums are released under the Twin Sisters Productions label.

Awards and recognitions
National Parenting Publications (NAPPA) Gold Award (1999, 2000, 2002, 2005, 2007, 2009, 2010)
Dr. Toy's 10 Best Toys Winner (2009)
Learning Magazine's Teachers Choice Award (1995, 2002, 2004)
iParenting Media Award (2003, 2004)
National Parenting Center Seal of Approval (2001, 2002, 2003, 2004, 2005, 2007, 2009)
National Parenting Publications Award (2012)
Smart Business Magazine Northeast Ohio Smart 50 Award (2017)
Voting member of The Recording Academy (NARAS) 
Prior member of Society of Women Engineers
Prior member of Recording Industry Association of America (RIAA)

References

External links
Official site

1962 births
Living people
American women songwriters
American women writers
People from Akron, Ohio
Purdue University College of Engineering alumni
21st-century American women